Alexander W. Barrie (18 August 1878 – 1 October 1918) was a Scottish professional footballer who played in the Scottish League for Kilmarnock, Rangers and St Bernard's as a centre half. He also played in the Football League for Sunderland and was capped by Scotland at junior level.

Personal life 
Barrie served as a corporal in the Highland Light Infantry during the First World War and was killed during the Battle of the Canal du Nord on 1 October 1918, just over five weeks before the armistice. He was buried in Flesquières Hill British Cemetery.

Career statistics

Honours 
Parkhead
 Scottish Junior Cup: 1898–99
Abercorn

 Scottish Qualifying Cup: 1912–13

References

1878 births
1918 deaths
Footballers from Glasgow
Scottish footballers
English Football League players
Association football midfielders
Parkhead F.C. players
British Army personnel of World War I
British military personnel killed in World War I
Highland Light Infantry soldiers
St Bernard's F.C. players
Sunderland A.F.C. players
Rangers F.C. players
Scottish Football League players
Kilmarnock F.C. players
Abercorn F.C. players
Scottish Junior Football Association players
Scotland junior international footballers